The 2015 season of the Belgian Football League (BFL) was the 29th edition of the Belgian championship in American Football Championship. The championship game was the Belgian Bowl XXVIII won by the Brussels Black Angels.

Regular season

Regular season standings
W = Wins, L = Losses, T = Ties, PCT = Winning Percentage, PF= Points For, PA = Points Against

 – clinched seed to the playoffs

Post season

The Belgian Bowl XXVIII was held on June 29, 2015, in Sint-Niklaas. The Brussels Black Angels won over the Brussels Tigers.

References

American football in Belgium
BFL
BFL